Batu Tiga–Sungai Buloh Highway, Selangor State Route B9, is the main highway in Klang Valley, Malaysia connects from Batu Tiga Interchange in Batu Tiga to Hospital Sungai Buloh in Sungai Buloh. The highway overlaps with a few roads with the same name but different code: Route 15 and Route 3214. At the Politeknik Junction, it extends towards the eastern side of Shah Alam which is the Persiaran Sukan. The Persiaran Sukan is basically a ring road that covers the eastern side of Shah Alam with some one-way road. The highway was upgraded in 2008.

Route background
The Kilometre Zero of the Batu Tiga–Sungai Buloh Highway starts at a few locations. The Main Link Kilometre starts at Hospital Sungai Buloh Junction Exit B901. The Jalan Monfort Kilometre starts at Politeknik Junction Exit B918, and the Persiaran Sukan Kilometre starts at the Stadium Interchange Exit B924.

Features

Notable features 
 Alternative road to Sungai Buloh
 Many traffic lights along the highway
 4 lanes (2 at each direction) Upgrade carriageway from Politeknik Interchange Until Bukit Jelutong Interchange

At most sections, the Federal Route B9 was built under the JKR R5 road standard, with a speed limit of 90 km/h.

Overlaps
 Kampung Melayu Subang–Hospital Sungai Buloh-MRR2 Interchange: 15 Jalan Subang
 Politeknik Junction–Batu Tiga Interchange: 3214 Jalan Subang

Alternate routes
 Bukit Jelutong North Interchange–Politeknik Junction: E35 Guthrie Corridor Expressway

Sections with motorcycle lanes

List of interchanges

Main Route

Persiaran Sukan

Persiaran Sukan (one way)

Highways in Malaysia
Roads in Selangor